Final Storm may refer to:

A Final Storm, 2010 album by Swedish post-rock band Khoma
The Final Storm (film), 2010 film directed by Uwe Boll
The Final Storm (Wayne Thomas Batson novel), 2007 novel in The Door Within Trilogy
The Final Storm (Jeff Shaara novel), 2011 novel by Jeff Shaara